Lucille Theresa Bliss (March 31, 1916 – November 8, 2012) was an American actress, known in the Bay Area and in Hollywood as the "Girl With a Thousand Voices".

A New York City native, Bliss lent her voice to numerous television characters, including the title character of the very first made-for-television cartoon, Crusader Rabbit, Smurfette on the popular 1980s cartoon The Smurfs and Ms. Bitters on the Nickelodeon animated series Invader Zim.  In addition to her television roles, she was known for her work as a voice actress in feature films.

Life and career

Family
Bliss' parents were James Francis and Frieda (née Simmons) Bliss. Her mother was "a classically trained pianist who wanted Bliss to train as an opera singer". Her father's death in 1928 prompted Mrs. Bliss and Lucille to move to San Francisco.

Radio
Bliss was active in old-time radio, having roles in Pat Novak, for Hire, Candy Matson, and The Charlie McCarthy Show.

Film
Bliss' first voice work was the role of the wicked stepsister Anastasia Tremaine in Walt Disney's 1950 feature film Cinderella, for which she was honored 50 years later by the Young Artist Foundation with its Former Child Star "Lifetime Achievement" Award in March 2000.

Television
In the early years of television, Bliss acted in Harbor Command and The Lineup. From 1950 to 1957, Bliss was "Auntie Lou" on San Francisco, California's KRON-TV's The Happy Birthday To You Show, also known as Birthday Party Show, which had guests from adults, to children, to animals. The program included use of Disney cartoon characters, as Bliss "picked up exclusive rights in northern California for the right to use Disney clips on her new show." At the same time, she did voices for Hanna-Barbera while they were working for the Metro-Goldwyn-Mayer cartoon studio – as Tuffy in Robin Hoodwinked, as Leprechaun in Droopy Leprechaun and later was Hugo on an episode of The Flintstones. She was also the narrator on three stories from the Disney album "Peter Cottontail and Other Funny Bunnies": "Story of Thumper", :Story of the White Rabbit", and "Story of Grandpa Bunny". Bliss was also a voice-over performer for Airborne radio spots in 2004.

Volunteer efforts
Bliss produced and directed talent shows for the Embarcadero Armed Services YMCA in San Francisco. Some service personnel launched professional careers from those shows.

Death
Bliss died from natural causes on November 8, 2012 in Costa Mesa, California, at the age of 96. She was buried at Hollywood Forever Cemetery.

Filmography

 Cinderella (1950) – Anastasia Tremaine (Credit cut)
 Crusader Rabbit (1950–52) – Crusader Rabbit
 Alice in Wonderland (1951) – Daisy / Tulip (Uncredited)
 Peter Pan (1953) – Mermaid / Tiger Lily(Uncredited)
 A Kiddies Kitty (1955) – Suzanne (Uncredited)
 The Waggily Tale (1958) – Little Girl/Mama (Uncredited)
 Robin Hoodwinked (1958) – Tuffy
 Droopy Leprechaun (1958) – Leprechaun
 How to Have an Accident at Work (1959) – Donald's son
 The Flintstones (1960) – Hugo (episode "The Good Scout", Uncredited)
 101 Dalmatians (1961) – TV Commercial Singer
 DoDo, The Kid from Outer Space (1965–70) – DoDo
 The Space Kidettes (1966–67) – Snoopy
 Funnyman (1967) – Girl of 1000 voices
 The Tiny Tree (1975) – Field Mouse
 The Flintstones' Christmas (1977) – Bamm-Bamm Rubble
 The Flintstones: Little Big League (1978) – Dusty
 Casper the Friendly Ghost: He Ain't Scary, He's Our Brother (1979) - Gervais, Carmelita, Nice Lady
 Hug Me (1981)
 The Smurfs (1981–89) – Smurfette
 The Secret of NIMH (1982) – Mrs. Beth Fitzgibbons
 The Great Bear Scare (1983) – Miss Witch
 Chuck E. Cheese - The Christmas That Almost Wasn't (1983) - Mrs. Claus
 Strong Kids, Safe Kids (1984) – Pebbles Flintstone/Bamm-Bamm Rubble/Smurfette/Baby Smurf/Pac-Baby
 Cap'n O. G. Readmore (1985–92) - Lickety Page
 Rainbow Brite: San Diego Zoo Adventure (1986) – Narrator
 Assassination (1987) – Crone
 The Night Before (1988) – Gal Baby
 Miracle Mile (1988) – Old Woman in Diner
 Betty Boop's Hollywood Mystery (1989) - Miss Green
 Asterix and the Big Fight (1989) – Impedimenta (aka Bonnemine)
 Tales of the City (1993) – Cable Car Lady
 Thumbelina Narrated by Mayim Bialik (1994) - Miscellaneous (video game)
 Space Quest VI: The Spinal Frontier (1995) – Sharpei/Waitron (video game)
 Wacked (1997) – Jane Katz
 Star Wars: Bounty Hunter (2002) – Rozatta (video game)
 Battlestar Galactica (2003) – Shaden (video game)
 Blue Harvest Days (2005) – Bear Brat
 Robots (2005) – Pigeon Lady
 Avatar: The Last Airbender (2005) – Yugoda
 Invader Zim (2001–02; 2006) – Ms. Bitters, Woman #2(episode "Parent-Teacher Night")
 Up-In-Down Town (2007) – Quinby

References

External links

 
 
 
 

1916 births
2012 deaths
Actresses from New York City
American film actresses
American television actresses
American radio actresses
Television personalities from New York City
American women television personalities
20th-century American actresses
21st-century American actresses
Burials at Hollywood Forever Cemetery
Metro-Goldwyn-Mayer cartoon studio people